Ernest Victor Thompson MBE (14 July 1931 – 19 July 2012) was an English author of historical novels.

Thompson served in the Royal Navy for nine years and then joined the Bristol Police. He later became the chief security officer for the Department of Aviation in Rhodesia. In 1970 he moved to Cornwall to concentrate on being an author. Thompson specialised in historical novels mainly based in Cornwall and wrote over 40 books. His novel Chase the Wind was voted as the best historical novel of the year.

Thompson was appointed a Member of the Order of the British Empire in the 2012 New Year Honours for services to literature and the community in Cornwall.

Thompson died on 19 July 2012 at his home at Launceston, Cornwall aged 81.

Books
1977 Chase the Wind
1978 Harvest of the Sun
1979 Music Makers
1980 Ben Retallick
1981 The Dream Traders
1982 Singing Spears
1983 The Restless Sea
1984 100 Years on Bodmin Moor
1984 Cry Once Alone
1985 Republic
1985 Polrudden
1986 The Stricken Land
1988 Becky
1989 God's Highlander
1990 Lottie Trago
1991 Cassie
1992 Whychwood
1992 Blue Dress Girl
1993 Mistress of Polrudden
1994 Tolpuddle Woman
1995 Ruddlemoor
1996 Lewin's Mead
1996 Moontide
1997 Cast No Shadows
1997 Mud Huts and Missionaries
1998 Fires of Evening
1999 Here, There and Yesterday
1999 Homeland
1999 Somewhere a Bird is Singing
2000 Winds of Fortune
2001 Seek a New Dawn
2002 The Lost Years
2003 Paths of Destiny
2004 Tomorrow Is For Ever
2005 The Vagrant King
2006 Brothers in War
2007 Though the Heavens May Fall
2008 No Less Than the Journey
2009 Churchyard and Hawke
2010 Beyond the Storm
2012 Hawke's Tor
2012 The Bonds of Earth

References

1931 births
2012 deaths
Members of the Order of the British Empire
English historical novelists
Bards of Gorsedh Kernow
British police officers
Royal Navy sailors
Novelists from Cornwall
20th-century English novelists